H. T. Sangliana (born 1 July 1943) was a member of the 14th Lok Sabha of India. He represented the Bangalore North of Karnataka from the BJP, but lost the election for 15th Lok Sabha from Bangalore Central with INC. He was given the post of Vice-Chairperson, National Commission for Minorities, with a status equivalent to the Minister of State in the central government.

He is a native of the Indian state of Mizoram and was formerly a police officer who held the post of Commissioner of Police, Bangalore City. As Deputy Commissioner of Police (Traffic) in Bangalore City, he was notable for his attempts to tackle the issue of illegal parking. He retired from the Indian Police Service after 36 years on 1 July 2003, at which time he was Director General of Police and Inspector General of Prisons.

After retiring, on invitation by BJP he ran for the old Bangalore North Lok Sabha constituency for the BJP and defeated 34 other candidates. He was expelled from BJP for voting in favour of civilian nuclear deal with the US for which a no-confidence motion was moved against the UPA in Lok Sabha on 22 July 2008, and then joined the Indian National Congress. He contested the newly formed Bangalore Central constituency for the INC in the 2009 Lok Sabha elections and lost to the BJP candidate, P. C. Mohan, by 59,665 votes.

Sangliana was one of 160 international delegates who joined US president-elect Barack Obama at his breakfast table on 10 February 2008. Three films have been made about Sangliana. He was portrayed as a super-cop in the Kannada movie S. P. Sangliana (1988), starring Shankar Nag and Ambareesh.

References

External links 
H.T.Sangliana Lok Sabha home page
Dr. H.T Sangliana For President of India

Living people
1943 births
Indian National Congress politicians from Karnataka
India MPs 2004–2009
People from Aizawl
Lok Sabha members from Karnataka
Politicians from Bangalore
Bharatiya Janata Party politicians from Karnataka
Karnataka Police
Indian Police Service officers